Yaylapınar may refer to:

 Yaylapınar, Bayburt
 Yaylapınar, Çameli
 Yaylapınar, Feke
 Yaylapınar, İliç
 Yaylapınar, Refahiye